Ennomos autumnaria, the large thorn, is a moth of the family Geometridae. The species can be found in Western and Central Europe East to  Russia and Siberia

The wingspan is 40–50 mm. The length of the forewings is 21–28 mm. The ground colour is brown, red-brown or yellow-brown to yellowish beige. The forewing edge is scalloped and the forewing is marked with yellow and dark brown lines. The thorax is yellow to light brown. The antennae of the male are pectinate. The caterpillar is light yellowish-brown to reddish. It is up to 50 mm long. On segment five there few humps and on segment nine two long protrusions.It resembles a dead twig.

Similar species: other Ennomos

Biotopes: Forest edges, parks, gardens with trees.

The moths fly in one generation from September to October. They are attracted to light.

The caterpillars feed on a number of deciduous trees.(Quercus sp., Alnus sp., Prunus sp., Salix sp., Tilia sp., Malus sp., Populus sp., Acer sp., Betula sp., Ulmus sp.).

Notes
The flight season refers to the British Isles. This may vary in other parts of the range.

External links
Large thorn on UKmoths
Fauna Europaea
Lepidoptera of Belgium
Lepiforum.de
Vlindernet.nl 

Ennomini
Moths described in 1859
Moths of Asia
Moths of Europe